Balwantrai Mehta ( – ) was an Indian politician who served as the second Chief Minister of Gujarat state, India. He participated in Indian independence movement and later held various public offices. He is considered as the 'Architect of Panchayati Raj ' due to his contributions towards democratic decentralisation.

Early life
Balwantrai Gopalji Mehta was born on 19 February 1900 in Bhavnagar State in a middle-class family. He studied up to B.A classes but refused to take the degree from the foreign government.

Political career 
He joined the national movement of non-co-operation in 1920. He founded Bhavanagar Praja Mandal in 1921 for carrying on the freedom movement in that state. He participated in the Civil Disobedience movement from 1930 to 1932. He also participated in Bardoli Satyagraha. He was sentenced for three years imprisonment in Quit India Movement of 1942. He spent total seven years in prison during British colony. On Mahatma Gandhi's suggestion, he accepted membership of the Congress Working Committee. When Jawaharlal Nehru became president of All India Congress Committee, he was elected its general secretary. He was twice elected, in 1949  and was again elected in 1957 Indian general election to the 2nd Lok Sabha from Gohilwad (Bhavnagar) Constituency.

He was the Chairman of Estimate committee of Parliament. He chaired the committee set up by Government of India in January 1957 to examine the working of the Community Development Programme and the National Extension Service and to suggest measures for their better working. The committee submitted its report in November 1957 and recommended the establishment of the scheme of 'democratic decentralisation' which finally came to be known as Panchayati Raj.

He also remained President of Servants of the People Society (Lok Sevak Mandal), a social service organisation founded by Lala Lajpat Rai, in 1921.

He succeeded Jivraj Narayan Mehta as the Chief Minister of Gujarat on 25 February 1963.

Death

During the Indo-Pakistani War of 1965, on 19 September 1965, then serving chief minister Mehta flew in a Beechcraft commuter aircraft from Tata Chemicals, Mithapur to the Kutch border between India and Pakistan. The plane was piloted by Jahangir Engineer, a former Indian Air Force pilot. It was shot down by Pakistan Air Force pilot Qais Hussain, who assumed it to be a reconnaissance mission.  Mehta was killed in the crash along with his wife, three members of his staff, a journalist and two crew members.

In August 2011 Qais Hussain wrote to Jahangir Engineer's daughter apologizing for his mistake, stating that a "civilian plane was mistaken for a reconnaissance aircraft by Pakistani controllers, and he was ordered to shoot it down".

Commemoration
The Department of Post, Government of India has issued a special postage stamp of face value INR 3.00 to commemorate his 100th birth anniversary on 17 February 2000.

See also
 List of assassinated Indian politicians

References

Year of birth uncertain
1965 deaths
People from Bhavnagar
Indian independence activists from Gujarat
Chief Ministers of Gujarat
Assassinated Indian politicians
People of the Indo-Pakistani War of 1965
People murdered in Gujarat
Victims of aircraft shootdowns
Victims of aviation accidents or incidents in India
Victims of aviation accidents or incidents in 1965
Members of the Constituent Assembly of India
India MPs 1957–1962
Lok Sabha members from Gujarat
Chief ministers from Indian National Congress
Indian National Congress politicians
Male murder victims
1965 murders in India